The 12th Aeromedical Airlift Squadron in an inactive United States Air Force unit.  From 1956 through 1969, it flew aeromedical evacuation missions from McGuire Air Force Base.  In 1985, the squadron was consolidated with two World War II units, but remained inactive.  The consolidated squadrons were the 12th Ferrying Squadron, which ferried aircraft to Europe and from factories to flying units from 1942 and 1944; and the 162d Liaison Squadron, which tested equipment and developed tactics for liaison units between 1944 and 1946.

History

Ferrying
The first predecessor of the squadron, the 12th Air Corps Ferrying Squadron, was activated on 8 April 1942 at Logan Field, Massachusetts, but moved the following month to New Castle Army Air Base, Delaware.  While stationed in the Northeast, the squadron was primarily involved with delivering aircraft to the European Theater of Operations.  In early 1943, the squadron moved to Love Field, Texas, and concentrated on ferrying aircraft from manufacturers to operational and training units.  At the end of March 1944, Air Transport Command (ATC) reorganized its units in the United States under the Base Unit system, and the 12th was disbanded and with all other ATC units at Love Field was reorganized into the 555th AAF Base Unit.  It was reconstituted and consolidated with the other predecessor units in September 1985.

Liaison tactics development

The squadron's second predecessor is the 162nd Liaison Squadron, which was activated at Aiken Army Air Field, South Carolina on 15 May 1944.  Like most liaison squadrons, it was equipped with the Stinson L-5 Sentinel.  The squadron developed tactics and tested equipment for liaison units in the Army Air Forces.  In particular, during 1945, it tested the suitability of Sikorsky helicopters for the liaison mission.  In December 1945, it moved to Brooks Field, Texas, where it operated with the 69th Reconnaissance Group through July.  The squadron inactivated on 3 October 1946 and was consolidated with the other predecessor units in September 1985.

Medical evacuation
The 12th Aeromedical Transport Squadron was activated at McGuire Air Force Base, New Jersey on 8 November 1956, when the 1st Aeromedical Transport Group, which was stationed at Brooks Air Force Base, Texas, replaced the 1706th Air Transport Group.  The group was responsible for aeromedical evacuation missions throughout the United States.  The 12th Squadron was equipped with Convair C-131 Samaritans and was primarily responsible for evacuation missions in the northeastern United States.  In June 1964, Military Air Transport Service (MATS) reorganized its medical evacuation squadrons under the 1405th Aeromedical Transport Wing, stationed at Scott Air Force Base, Illinois.  In 1965, mission responsibility expanded to included Newfoundland and Labrador.

When Military Airlift Command (MAC) replaced MATS in January 1966, the 375th Aeromedical Airlift Wing replaced the 1405th Wing and the squadron became the 12th Aeromedical Airlift Squadron.  It continued its mission until inactivating in June 1969 as the more capable Douglas HC-9 Nightingale permitted consolidation of the medical evacuation mission in the United States into one location, Scott Air Force Base.

The three squadrons were consolidated into one in September 985, retaining the 12th Airlift designation, but have remained inactive.

Lineage
 12th Ferrying Squadron
 Constituted as the 12th Air Corps Ferrying Squadron on 18 February 1942
 Activated on 8 April 1942
 Redesignated 12th Ferrying Squadron c. 12 May 1943
 Disbanded on 31 March 1944
 Reconstituted and consolidated with the 12th Aeromedical Airlift Squadron and 162d Liaison Squadron as the 12th Aeromedical Airlift Squadron on 19 September 1985

 162nd Liaison Squadron
 Constituted as the 162nd Liaison Squadron on 11 May 1944
 Activated on 15 May 1944
 Inactivated on 3 October 1946
 Consolidated with the 12th Aeromedical Airlift Squadron and 12th Ferrying Squadron as the 12th Aeromedical Airlift Squadron on 19 September 1985

 12th Aeromedical Airlift Squadron
 Constituted 18 October 1956 as the 12th Aeromedical Transport Squadron, Light
 Activated on 8 November 1956
 Redesignated 12th Aeromedical Transport Squadron on 25 July 1964
 Redesignated 12th Aeromedical Airlift Squadron on 8 January 1966
 Inactivated on 8 June 1969
 Consolidated with the 12th Ferrying Squadron and 162d Liaison Squadron on 19 September 1985

Assignments
 Northeast Sector, Air Corps Ferrying Command (later 2d Ferrying Group), 8 April 1942
 5th Ferrying Group, c. 13 January 1943  – 31 March 1944
 III Tactical Air Division, 15 May 1944
 II Tactical Air Division, 24 June 1944
 III Tactical Air Command, 1 September 1945
 XIX Tactical Air Command, 25 October 1945
 Tactical Air Command, 21 March 1946
 Ninth Air Force, 28 March – 3 October 1946
 1st Aeromedical Transport Group, 8 November 1956
 1405th Aeromedical Transport Wing, 8 June 1964
 375th Aeromedical Airlift Wing, 8 January 1966 – 8 June 1969

Stations
 Logan Field, Massachusetts, 8 April 1942
 New Castle Army Air Base, Delaware, c. 29 May 1942
 Love Field, Texas, c. 13 January 1943 – 31 March 1944
 Aiken Army Air Field, South Carolina, 15 May 1944
 Lafayette Airport, Louisiana, 13 July 1944
 Alexandria Army Air Field, Louisiana, 14 September 1945
 Brooks Field, Texas, 6 December 1945 – 3 October 1946
 McGuire Air Force Base, New Jersey, 8 November 1956 – 8 June 1969

Aircraft
 Stinson L-5 Sentinel, 1944-1946
 Sikorsky R-5 1945
 Sikorsky YR-6, 1945
 Convair C-131 Samaritan, 1956-1969

Awards and campaigns

References

Notes
 Explanatory notes

 Citations

Bibliography

 
 

 
Airlift squadrons of the United States Air Force